Chittagong Elevated Expressway is Bangladesh's second elevated expressway project, which will connect the Shah Amanat airport with Lalkhan Bazaar. The Max-Ranken Joint Venture has entered contract with Chittagong Development Authority for building the Chittagong Elevated Expressway.

Contracts for the expressway
The Max-Ranken Joint Venture has entered contract with Chittagong Development Authority for building the Chittagong Elevated Expressway.

See also
 List of megaprojects in Bangladesh
 List of roads in Bangladesh
 Dhaka Elevated Expressway

References 

Transport in Chittagong
Expressways in Bangladesh
Roads in Bangladesh